Johannes "Congo" Hindjou (born 8 November 1976) is a Namibian former professional footballer who played as a midfielder. He was capped 25 times and scored two goals for the Namibia national football team, including a stint at the 1998 African Cup of Nations. He played for Liverpool Okahandja, Civics—winning the Namibia Premier League with both clubs—before retiring in 2007 after a spell with African Stars. He later coached Okahandja Spoilers and Eleven Arrows.

References

1976 births
Living people
Namibian men's footballers
Association football midfielders
Namibia international footballers
1998 African Cup of Nations players
Namibia Premier League players
F.C. Civics Windhoek players
African Stars F.C. players
Namibian football managers